Intwood is a village and former civil parish, now in the parish of Keswick and Intwood, in the South Norfolk district, in the county of Norfolk, England, south west of Norwich. Its church, All Saints, is one of 124 extant round-tower churches in Norfolk. In 1931 the parish had a population of 54.

History 
The villages name means 'Inta's wood'. On 1 April 1935 the parish was abolished and merged with Keswick.

References

External links

All Saints on the European Round Tower Churches Website

Villages in Norfolk
Former civil parishes in Norfolk
South Norfolk